It Had to Be You: The Great American Songbook is the first album of American pop standards recorded by British musician Rod Stewart, and his 20th album overall. It was released on 22 October 2002, and became the first in a five-volume series.

The album was Stewart's first release for Sony Music imprint J Records. It included his second recording of "Every Time We Say Goodbye."

A live DVD of the same title was released on 4 February 2003, which featured performances of material from the studio album as well as Stewart's earlier material.

Track listing

Personnel 

 Rod Stewart – lead vocals
 Will Hollis – acoustic piano (1, 2), synthesizers (2), string synthesizer and solo arrangements (2), vibraphone (3)
 Renato Neto – acoustic piano (1), string synthesizer (1), arrangements (1), synth flute (13)
 Randy Kerber – acoustic piano (3, 7, 13), synthesizers (3, 7, 13)
 Andrew Chukerman – synthesizers (3, 7, 10, 13)
 Rob Mounsey – keyboards (4, 5, 8), acoustic piano (4, 5), rhythm arrangements and conductor (4)
 Philippe Saisse – keyboards (4, 5, 6, 8, 9, 10, 12, 14), orchestra arrangements and conductor (5, 8, 12)
 Russ Kassoff – acoustic piano (8, 10, 12, 14)
 Lee Musiker – acoustic piano intro (9)
 Randy Waldman – acoustic piano (11)
 Jim Fox – guitar (1) 
 Jimmy Rip – guitar (1, 2)
 Bob Mann – guitar (3, 7, 13), arrangements (3, 7, 13), guitar solo (7)
 Jeff Mironov – guitar (4, 5, 6, 8, 9, 10, 12, 14), guitar solo (14)
 Dennis Budimir – guitar (11)
 Dave Carpenter – bass (1)
 Reggie McBride – bass (2)
 Bob Magnusson – bass (3, 7, 13)
 David Finck – bass (4, 5, 6, 8, 9, 10, 12, 14)
 Tal Bergman – drums (1), drum programming (1, 11), arrangements (1),  percussion (7)
 John Ferraro – drums (2), percussion (7)
 Allan Schwartzberg – drums (3, 7, 13)
 Shawn Pelton – drums (4, 5, 6, 8, 9, 10, 12, 14)
 Harvey Mason – drums (11)
 Dan Higgins – clarinet solo (1), alto saxophone solo (2)
 Michael Brecker – tenor saxophone solo (4)
 Dave Koz – tenor saxophone solo (6, 10)
 Arturo Sandoval – trumpet solo (5), flugelhorn solo (8)
 Chris Botti – trumpet solo (13)
 Richard Perry – arrangements (1), basic track arrangement (2)
 Don Sebesky – orchestra arrangements and conductor (4, 8, 12), rhythm arrangements and conductor (4, 8, 12), arrangements and conductor (9), acoustic piano (9)
 Doug Katsaros – rhythm arrangements (5), arrangements and conductor (6, 10, 14), acoustic piano (6)
 Jeremy Lubbock – string arrangements and conductor (11), woodwind arrangements and conductor (11)

Production 
 Producers – Richard Perry (Tracks 1, 2, 3, 7, 11 & 13); Phil Ramone (Tracks 4, 5, 6, 8, 9, 10, 12 & 14).
 Associate Producers on Track 1 – Tal Bergman and Renato Neto
 Vocal production on Track 11 – Phil Ramone
 Executive Producer – Clive Davis
 A&R – Keith Naftaly
 Production Coordination on Tracks 1, 2, 3, 7, 11 & 13 – Ben McCarthy
 Music Consultant on Tracks 1, 2, 3, 7, 11 & 13 –  Daphna Kaster
 Production Manager and Music Contractor on Tracks 4, 5, 6, 8, 9, 10, 12 & 14 – Jill Dell'Abate
 Recording Engineers – Mark Valentine (Track 1); Carter Humphrey (Tracks 2 & 3); Jeff "Woody" Woodruff (Tracks 2, 3, 7, 11 & 13); Frank Filipetti (Tracks 4, 5, 6, 8, 9, 10, 12 & 14).
 Additional Engineering and Pro Tools Technicians on Tracks 1, 2, 3, 7, 11 & 13 – J.J. Blair, Brian Cook, Steve Deutsch, Alex Gibson, Bobby Ginsberg, Johnny Kubelka and Trent Slatton.
 Additional Engineering on Tracks 4, 5, 6, 8, 9, 10, 12 & 14 – Joel Moss, Freddy Pinero, Chris Steinmetz and Jeff "Woody" Woodruff.
 Assistant Engineers on Tracks 4, 5, 6, 8, 9, 10, 12 & 14 – Wade Childers, Brian Dixon, Andrew Felluss, Nick Howard, Timorhy Olmstead and Ryan Smith.
 Pro Tools Operation on Tracks 4, 5, 6, 8, 9, 10, 12 & 14 – Steve Deutsch, Andrew Felluss and Pete Karam.
 Mixing – Carter Humphrey (Tracks 1, 2, 3, 7, 11 & 13); Frank Filipetti (Tracks 4, 5, 6, 8, 9, 10, 12 & 14).
 Mix Assistants on Tracks 4, 5, 6, 8, 9, 10, 12 & 14 – Andrew Felluss and Timorhy Olmstead 
 Tracks 1, 2, 3, 7, 11 & 13 mastered by Stephen Marcussen at Marcussen Mastering (Los Angeles, CA); Tracks 4, 5, 6, 8, 9, 10, 12 & 14 mastered by Ted Jensen at Sterling Sound (New York, NY).
 Special Production Support on Tracks 1, 2, 3, 7, 11 & 13 –  Lauren Wild
 Additional Production Support on Tracks 1, 2, 3, 7, 11 & 13 – Larry Emerine at Precision Lacquer (Los Angeles); Drew L. and Don Tyler at Quality CD Duplication (Los Angeles).
 Creative Director – Alli Truch
 Art Direction – Jeri Heiden for SMOG L.A.
 Photography – Andrew MacPherson
 Management – Annie Challis and Arnold Stiefel at Stiefel Entertainment.
 Liner Notes – Rod Stewart and Bill Zehme

Live DVD
 "Forever Young" (Jim Cregan, Kevin Savigar, Bob Dylan, Rod Stewart)
 "Some Guys Have All the Luck" (Jeff Fortgang)
 "They Can't Take That Away from Me" (G. Gershwin, I. Gershwin)
 "The Way You Look Tonight" (Fields, Kern)
 "These Foolish Things" (Link, Marvell, Strachey)
 "Moonglow" (DeLange, Hudson, Mills)
 "Every Time We Say Goodbye" (Porter)
 "The Very Thought of You" (Noble)
 "That Old Feeling" (Brown, Fain)
 "You Go to My Head" (Coots, Gillespie)
 "For All We Know" (Coots, Lewis)
 "The Nearness of You" (Carmichael, Washington)
 "That's All" (Brandt, Haymes)
 "We'll Be Together Again" (Fischer, Laine)
 "Rhythm of My Heart" (Marc Jordan, John Capek)
 "Downtown Train" (Tom Waits)
 "Maggie May" (Stewart, Martin Quittenton)
 "Young Turks" (Stewart, Carmine Appice, Duane Hitchings, Savigar)
 "Hot Legs" (Stewart, Gary Grainger)
 "Having a Party" (Sam Cooke)
 "I'll Be Seeing You" (Fain, Kahal)
 "It Takes Two" (William "Mickey" Stevenson, Sylvia Moy)

Charts

Weekly charts

Year-end charts

Certifications

Album

DVD

References

External links

2002 albums
Rod Stewart albums
Albums produced by Richard Perry
Albums produced by Phil Ramone
Albums produced by Clive Davis
Covers albums
Traditional pop albums
Albums recorded at MSR Studios
Albums recorded at A&M Studios